Magam is a tehsil in central Kashmir's  Beerwah sub-district. It is also a town, notified area committee, and a  block in Budgam district in the Indian administered union territory of  Jammu and Kashmir. Magam is top business hub in this locality, which comes before on the way to gulmarg. Magam comes both in baramulla  district and budgam which makes this famous across these districts for business.

The Idara Abu Fazal Abbas Islamic Library, opened in Magam in 1985, is the largest Islamic private library in Jammu and Kashmir.

Economy

Magam is well known by its business and is being considered the hub of business in district Budgam due to its wide marketing connectivity  with various districts like Budgam, Baramulla and Srinagar. Due to the growing business in Magam every commercial financial institution is approaching towards it, it has seven ATM machines and seven commercial Banks.

Demographics
, Magam had a population of 5,470, of which 18% is under 6 years of age. Magam has an average literacy rate of 51.22%, 27.28% lower than the national average of 78.5%. The male literacy rate in Magam is 57%, while the female rate is 42%.

Education

Magam has two higher secondary schools namely Government Boys Higher Secondary Institute, Government Girls Higher Secondary Institute. At the secondary level, it has  Lucent International school ,R.M.P school , Green View Public High School,Government middle school for boys and girls (separate) Yagipora, Raheislam Educational Organisation, the New Convent School
 Lucent International School is a franchise based school of Dehradun  that provides transport to all connected wide areas of district Budgam and Srinagar.

These institutes offer teaching in the arts, science, and commerce streams. Government Degree College Magam was established in 2012. The college offers courses like BA, B.Com, and BBA. The College also hosts an IGNOU Study Centre (30026) where students get higher education through distance learning. A technical institute operates there. Himayat centres play a role in Magam to provide student internships.

Transport
Magam is well-connected with the State and District Highway roads; it is also connected by rail to Srinagar and Gulmarg. The town has a post office. Two bus stands provide transportation to adjoining areas.

Magam is famous for tanga (a light horse-drawn two-wheeled vehicle). These tangas were first used by tourists to travel from Magam to Gulmarg and for other local transport. These tangas can still be seen in Magam. Tonga ride is still known as Kings' ride.

References

 Cities and towns in Budgam district